School District 50 Haida Gwaii is a school district in British Columbia, Canada. It covers Haida Gwaii (formerly the Queen Charlotte Islands) off the north coast of British Columbia immediately west of Prince Rupert. Centered in Daajing Giids (formerly known as Queen Charlotte City), it includes the communities of Sandspit, Masset, Skidegate, and Port Clements.

Schools

See also
List of school districts in British Columbia

References

"Student Headcount by Grade." Education Analytics, Government of BC. n.d. Web. Accessed 5 Apr. 2021 from: https://catalogue.data.gov.bc.ca/dataset/bc-schools-student-headcount-by-grade/resource/c1a55945-8554-4058-9019-514b16178f89 (Line 6234)

External links
BC Ministry of Education school information
List of schools
SD50 Website

North Coast Regional District
50
Haida Gwaii